Burt Street may refer to:
Burt Street, Boulder, Australia
Burt Street, Fremantle, Australia